Turbo sandwicensis, common name the Hawaiian top shell, is a species of sea snail, a marine gastropod mollusk in the family Turbinidae, the turban snails.

Description
The length of the shell varies between 15 mm and 45 mm. The shell is ovately turbinated, slightly perforated, somewhat tubulous and spirally ridged. The ridges are smooth alternately rather smaller, squamose. The scales are most prominent on the body whorl. The interstices between the ridges are finely imbricately laminated. The body whorl is somewhat angulated at the upper part. The color pattern of the shell is green, marbled and variegated with dark brownish red.

Distribution
This species occurs in the Pacific Ocean off Hawaii.

References

 Alf A. & Kreipl K. (2003). A Conchological Iconography: The Family Turbinidae, Subfamily Turbininae, Genus Turbo. Conchbooks, Hackenheim Germany

External links
 To World Register of Marine Species
 

sandwicensis
Gastropods described in 1861